Jin Hua (born 9 March 1972) is a Chinese speed skater. She competed at the 1994, 1998 and the 2002 Winter Olympics.

References

1972 births
Living people
Chinese female speed skaters
Olympic speed skaters of China
Speed skaters at the 1994 Winter Olympics
Speed skaters at the 1998 Winter Olympics
Speed skaters at the 2002 Winter Olympics
Sportspeople from Jilin
Speed skaters at the 1996 Asian Winter Games
Medalists at the 1996 Asian Winter Games
Asian Games medalists in speed skating
Asian Games bronze medalists for China
20th-century Chinese women
21st-century Chinese women